News18Lokmat is a 24-hour Marathi-language news channel based in Mumbai, Maharashtra, India. It is a joint venture between Network 18 and Lokmat Group the publisher of the newspaper Lokmat.

The channel was launched as IBN Lokmat on 6 April 2008, the day of the Hindu New Year festival Gudi Padwa. It was branded as News 18 Lokmat from 6 November 2017.

Journalist 

 Manoj khandekar
 Ashutosh Patil
 Vilas bade
 Hrishikesh Suryawanshi
 Tushar rupnavar
 Udya jadhav
 Kiran khutale
 Prajakta Tandel
 Nimisha dharurkar
 Yamini mahamunkar

References 

24-hour television news channels in India
Television stations in Mumbai
Marathi-language television channels
Network18 Group
Television channels and stations established in 2008